The 2006 Cork Premier Intermediate Hurling Championship was the third staging of the Cork Premier Intermediate Hurling Championship since its establishment by the Cork County Board in 2004. The championship began on 7 May 2006 and ended on 22 October 2006.

On 9 September 2006, St. Finbarr's were relegated from the championship following a 2-21 to 0-02 defeat by Ballincollig in a relegation play-off.

On 22 October 2006, Bishopstown won the championship following a 0-20 to 1-11 defeat of Carrigtwohill in the final. This was their first championship title in the grade.

Bishopstown's Pa Cronin was the championship's top scorer with 3-36.

Results

Round 1

Round 2

Relegation play-offs

Round 3

Quarter-finals

Semi-finals

Final

Championship statistics

Top scorers

Top scorer overall

Top scorers in a single game

Miscellaneous

 Bishopstown became the first team to win the championship undefeated.
 Bishopstown win their first Premier Intermediate title.

References

Cork Premier Intermediate Hurling Championship
Cork Premier Intermediate Hurling Championship